Samuel Matthews Robertson (January 1, 1852 – December 24, 1911) was a U.S. Representative from Louisiana, son of Edward White Robertson.

Born in Plaquemine, Iberville Parish, Louisiana, Robertson attended Magruder's Collegiate Institute, Baton Rouge, Louisiana, and studied law at Louisiana State University, graduating  in 1874.  He was admitted to the bar the same year and commenced practice in Baton Rouge, Louisiana.

Robertson was elected a member of the State house of representatives in 1879.
He served as member of the LSU faculty in 1880.

Robertson was elected as a Democrat to the Fiftieth Congress to fill the vacancy caused by the death of his father, Edward White Robertson.
He was reelected to the Fifty-first and to the eight succeeding Congresses, serving from December 5, 1887, to March 3, 1907.

He served as chairman of the Committee on Levees and Improvements of the Mississippi River (Fifty-second Congress).
He was an unsuccessful candidate for renomination in 1906, and resumed the practice of law in Baton Rouge.
He was superintendent of the Louisiana School for the Deaf and Dumb from 1908–1911, and died in Baton Rouge, Louisiana, December 24, 1911. 
He was interred in Magnolia Cemetery.

References

External links 
 

1852 births
1911 deaths
Louisiana State University alumni
Democratic Party members of the Louisiana House of Representatives
Louisiana State University faculty
Democratic Party members of the United States House of Representatives from Louisiana
19th-century American politicians
Burials at Magnolia Cemetery (Baton Rouge, Louisiana)